Hampton City Hall is a historic city hall located at Hampton, Virginia. It was built in 1938–1939, and is a two-story, concrete building clad in brick veneer and topped with a flat roof surrounded by a parapet in the Art Deco style.  In 1962, the building was expanded and converted for use as a Juvenile Courts and Probation Office.  The entrance façade is marked by stylized fluted columns flanking the double-leaf replacement entrance doors and glass block window. There is a stylized Art Deco motif panel surrounding the City of Hampton seal above the double-leaf doors and decorative transom.  Funding for the building's construction was provided by the Public Works Administration (PWA).

It was listed on the National Register of Historic Places in 2007.

The current City Hall is located on Lincoln Street and opened in 1976.

References

Public Works Administration in Virginia
City and town halls on the National Register of Historic Places in Virginia
Art Deco architecture in Virginia
Government buildings completed in 1939
Buildings and structures in Hampton, Virginia
National Register of Historic Places in Hampton, Virginia